The Sixmile Creek flows into the Mohawk River northwest of Oriskany, New York.

References 

Rivers of Oneida County, New York
Rivers of New York (state)